Salze may refer to:

Salze (Bega), a river of North Rhine-Westphalia, Germany, tributary of the Bega
Jacques Salze (born 1987), French footballer